WXXV-TV (channel 25) is a television station licensed to Gulfport, Mississippi, United States, serving the Mississippi Gulf Coast as an affiliate of Fox, MyNetworkTV, NBC and The CW Plus. The station is owned by Morris Multimedia, and maintains studios on US 49 in Lyman (with a Gulfport postal address); its transmitter is located on Wire Road East, in unincorporated Stone County, northeast of McHenry.

History
The station signed on February 14, 1987, as the market's second commercial outlet (after ABC affiliate WLOX). It was originally locally owned by Gulf Coast Television Ltd. Airing an analog signal on UHF channel 25, WXXV immediately joined Fox as Mississippi's first Fox affiliate. For the first four months of the network's existence, the network (which only aired late night programs at the time) was only available over-the-air in the extreme western and extreme eastern portions of the market via WNOL-TV in New Orleans (now an affiliate of The CW) or WPMI-TV in Mobile (now an NBC affiliate); WXXV signed on two months prior to Fox's first night of primetime programming. Gulf Coast Television sold the station to AmSouth Realty, a subsidiary of AmSouth Bank in 1989. Prime Cities Broadcasters bought the station in 1991. WXXV aired the ABC crime drama NYPD Blue for its entire run from 1993 until 2005, as WLOX refused to air it. From January 1995 until September 2006, the station also featured some limited UPN programming out-of-pattern through a secondary affiliation. Prime Cities Broadcasters sold the station to current owner Morris Multimedia in 1997.

A new second digital subchannel was launched in September 2006 to be the area's MyNetworkTV affiliate. Now considered a programming service rather than a true over-the-air broadcast network, it is a sister operation to Fox. WXXV's broadcasts became digital-only on February 17, 2009. The station continues to broadcast on digital channel 48. However, through the use of PSIP, digital television receivers display WXXV's virtual channel as 25. The station was added to DirecTV's local station offering on June 16, 2010.

The station also served as the Hattiesburg–Laurel market's longtime default Fox affiliate. WXXV's transmitter tower site and directional antenna pattern are strategically located and designed to enable the station to cover the entire southern half of Mississippi, including the Gulf Coast and Pine Belt regions. In addition, WXXV could be picked up locally on Comcast systems in the Pine Belt.

On October 13, 2011, low-power WHPM-LD joined the network as the first ever Fox outlet for Hattiesburg and Laurel. Despite the addition of that outlet to the network, Comcast's system in Hattiesburg and Laurel continues to offer WXXV's standard and high definition channels. That market still lacks its own MyNetworkTV-affiliated station resulting in WXXV being the Pine Belt's default affiliate (through its main channel's secondary affiliation as of 2015).

Subchannel history

WXXV-DT2
WXXV-DT2 is the NBC-affiliated second digital subchannel of WXXV-TV, broadcasting on channel 25.2. Over the air, WXXV-DT2 broadcasts a 720p high definition signal (downconverted from the native 1080i resolution of the NBC network); however, a direct-to-cable full 1080i high definition feed of this subchannel is available on select cable providers.

WXXV-DT2 first signed on in September 2006 to be the market's MyNetworkTV affiliate. On June 25, 2012, it was announced WXXV would become the area's first-ever locally based NBC affiliate. The MyNetworkTV affiliation was moved to cable-exclusive status so that WXXV-DT2 could become the NBC outlet. Prior to the station adding NBC, both WDSU-TV in New Orleans (for Gulfport, Long Beach and Pass Christian) and WDAM-TV in Hattiesburg–Laurel (for Biloxi, D'Iberville, Jackson County and Stone County) served as the Gulf Coast's longtime de facto affiliates on cable, with both affiliates having over-the-air coverage in some portions of the market.

WXXV-DT3
WXXV-DT3 is the CW+-affiliated third digital subchannel of WXXV-TV, broadcasting on channel 25.3.

What is now WXXV-DT3 began its life on September 21, 1998, as "WBGP" (standing for The WB Gulfport), a cable-only affiliate of The WB through the national WB 100+ service. Since it was only available on cable, the call sign was fictional in nature and thus not officially recognized by the Federal Communications Commission (FCC). Before its sign-on, viewers in the area received The WB through Superstation WGN or the network's New Orleans affiliates (first WGNO, then later WNOL-TV).

With the merge between UPN and The WB on September 18, 2006, the station became part of The CW through the new network's similar national service, The CW Plus. Throughout its cable-exclusive period, the station did not have an actual owner and had a signal provided to cable companies through a closed circuit satellite feed. "WBGP" was carried on CableOne (now Sparklight) channel 7 in Harrison County and channel 80 in Jackson County. Its previous CW logo referred to the channel 7 slot but it was not identified on-air with reference to it.

On January 1, 2015, WXXV took over promotional and advertising responsibilities of "WBGP" from CableOne. As a result, the service was added to a new third subchannel of WXXV in order to offer over-the-air viewers access to The CW for the first time. The new subchannel did not retain the slots on CableOne's basic tier allotted to "WBGP"; instead, WXXV-DT3 replaced WXXV's cable-only MyNetworkTV channel on digital channel 476. MyNetworkTV programming concurrently moved to a secondary affiliation on WXXV's primary channel and can be seen on weeknights from 10 until midnight.

WXXV-DT4
WXXV-DT4 is the Defy TV-affiliated fourth subchannel of WXXV-TV, broadcasting on channel 25.4.  It was launched upon Defy's sign-on in July 2021. During the fall of 2021, WXXV also brought Grit programming to the Mississippi Gulf Coast on its fifth subchannel.

Programming

Syndicated programming
Syndicated programming on WXXV-DT1 includes The Good Dish, The Big Bang Theory, Family Feud, and The Doctors among others. Syndicated programming on WXXV-DT2 includes Judge Judy, The Ellen DeGeneres Show, and Family Feud among others.

News operation

The station airs all national breaking news coverage from Fox News and the network's weekly public affairs show. Unlike most Fox affiliates, however, WXXV did not operate a local news department of its own for most of its existence but has done so in two previous attempts in the past. From 1991 to 1992, WDBD aired a local newscast called Mississippi News Tonight which was simulcasted on WXXV and produced by WLOX's then-owners Love Communications. Likewise, it featured regional news and weather coverage despite being produced at WDBD's studios in Jackson. Due to low ratings and inconsistent viewership, the program was dropped from both outlets after only a year on the air.

For a few years in the late-1990s and early 2000s, WXXV operated its own locally based news operation from its Gulfport studios. A broadcast, known as Fox 25 News at Nine, attempted to provide another option for viewers in the market besides longtime dominant WLOX. For an unknown reason, however, this effort also eventually ceased production.

On September 30, 2013, WXXV launched an in-house news operation for the second time in its history following the expansion of its studios to house the department; the station hired 15 personnel to staff the startup operation. Locally produced newscasts, running a half-hour in length, air on both the Fox and NBC channels in high definition under the News 25 branding. The main channel airs a weeknight prime time show at 9 p.m. while weeknight newscasts at 5:30 and 10 p.m. are seen on WXXV-DT2. NBC Nightly News is therefore aired on an alternate live feed at 6 p.m. which is unlike most NBC affiliates in the Central Time Zone. The NBC subchannel also carries local weather cut-ins on weekday mornings from 7 to 11 a.m. during the Today Show. The station does not maintain a sports department. On September 21, 2015, WXXV debuted an hour-long weekday morning newscast from 7 to 8 a.m. called News 25 Today on its main channel while it airs from 6 to 7 a.m. on the NBC subchannel. On September 27, 2015, it debuted a Sunday night newscast on both stations.

Technical information

Subchannels
The station's digital signal is multiplexed:

See also
Channel 25 virtual TV stations in the United States
Channel 25 digital TV stations in the United States

References

External links

WXXV-DT3 "Gulf Coast CW"

Television channels and stations established in 1987
1987 establishments in Mississippi
XXV-TV
NBC network affiliates
Fox network affiliates
MyNetworkTV affiliates
Defy TV affiliates
Grit (TV network) affiliates
Morris Multimedia